Armand Machabey (7 May 1886 – 31 August 1966) was a 20th-century French musicologist.

Biography 
A student of Vincent d'Indy at the Schola Cantorum de Paris and André Pirro at the Sorbonne, Machabey's thesis Histoire et évolution des formules musicales du Ier au XVe siècle de L'ère chrétienne which he defended in 1928, gave an important place to the music of Guillaume de Machaut, of whom he was one of the specialists by publishing the second complete edition of the Messe de Nostre Dame by (Guillaume de Machaut) in 1948 just after Jacques Chailley. In 1955 he wrote an important monograph in two volumes: Guillaume de Machault, 130-?-1377 : La vie et l'œuvre musical. He  was also the author of a Traité de La critique musicale, and another one entitled la Musicologie, as well as several biographies of composers including his master Vincent d'Indy, Anton Bruckner, Maurice Ravel, and Girolamo Frescobaldi.

Machabey was also the publisher of the Tournai Mass and the treaty Terminorum  musicæ diffinitorium by Johannes Tinctoris, and with Norbert Dufourcq and Félix Raugel, he directed the Encyclopédie Larousse de la musique (1957–1958).

Writings 
1945: La Musique des Hittites
1946: La Vie et l'œuvre d'Anton Bruckner
1947: Maurice Ravel
1947: Traité de la Critique musicale
1948: Le bel canto
1949: Portraits de 30 compositeurs français modernes
1952: La Notation musicale.
1952: Musique et médecine
1952: Frescobaldi.
1955: Guillaume de Machaut
1955: Genèse de la tonalité musicale classique
1955: La Cantilation manichéenne
1957 and 1959: Notations musicales non modales
1960: Mélanges musicologiques.

References

External links 
 Armand Machabey on the site of the Académie française
 Le musicologue et le musicographa au prisme des revues savantes
 Armand Machabey on Encyclopédie Larousse
  Armand Machabey on Musicalics

1886 births
People from Doubs
1966 deaths
French biographers
20th-century French musicologists